Gaston Frédéric Blanchy (1 July 1868 – 1 October 1944) was a French sailor who competed in the 1900 Summer Olympics. He was crew on the British/French boat Ollé, which won the gold medals in both races of the 2-3 ton class with fellow crew member Jacques Le Lavasseur and helmsman William Exshaw. He also participated in the open class, but did not finish.

Further reading

References

External links

1868 births
1944 deaths
French male sailors (sport)
Olympic sailors of France
Sailors at the 1900 Summer Olympics – 2 to 3 ton
Sportspeople from Bordeaux
Medalists at the 1900 Summer Olympics
Olympic gold medalists for France
Olympic medalists in sailing
Sailors at the 1900 Summer Olympics – Open class
20th-century French people